The Cimarron Valley Railroad  was built c. 1912 and purchased from Burlington Northern Santa Fe Railroad in February 1996.  It runs over former C.V. and Manter Subdivisions of the Atchison, Topeka and Santa Fe Railroad tracks in Oklahoma, Colorado and Kansas.  One line runs from Dodge City, KS to Boise City, OK, the other from Satanta, KS to Springfield, CO.  It runs a total of 254 miles of track primarily hauling agricultural commodities (such as wheat, corn, and milo), along with sand, cement, poles, pipe, and fertilizers.  CVR was one of several short-line railroads operated by The Western Group of Ogden, Utah.

As of November 2009, the Kansas Department of Transportation and partners are planning a renovation and upgrade of the line.

On November 1, 2020, The Cimarron Valley Railroad was purchased by Jaguar Transport Holdings.

References

External links

 "The Southwest Railfan, featuring railroads in Texas and the Southwest"
 The Western Group
 Jaguar Transport Holdings

Colorado railroads
Kansas railroads
Oklahoma railroads
Haskell County, Kansas
Switching and terminal railroads
Spin-offs of the Atchison, Topeka and Santa Fe Railway